Ronald Christopher Smith (born June 27, 1942) is a retired American football quarterback  who spent one season with the Pittsburgh Steelers of the National Football League. He played 9 games for the Steelers in 1966, and 1 for the Los Angeles Rams in 1965. The Rams traded Smith to the Packers who traded him August 31 1966 to the Steelers.

1942 births
Living people
Players of American football from Richmond, Virginia
American football quarterbacks
Richmond Spiders football players
Los Angeles Rams players
Pittsburgh Steelers players